The Yankee Conference was a collegiate sports conference in the eastern United States. From 1947 to 1976, it sponsored competition in many sports, but was a football-only league from mid-1976 until its dissolution in 1996. It is essentially the ancestor of today's Colonial Athletic Association (CAA) football conference, and the continuation of the New England Conference, though all three leagues were founded under different charters and are considered separate conferences by the NCAA.

For the first half of its history, the Yankee Conference consisted of the flagship public universities of the six New England states. Conference expansion in the 1980s and 1990s added several colleges and universities from the Mid-Atlantic region.

Formation
In 1945, Northeastern University, the only private school in the New England Conference, announced its departure. A committee formed by the remaining four members, land-grant colleges and universities representing Connecticut, Maine, New Hampshire and Rhode Island, recommended that they join with the other two New England land-grant institutions, Massachusetts State College (which had also been a founding member of the NEC in 1923, but left in the 1930s) and the University of Vermont, in a new athletics league. This led to the formation of the Yankee Conference in December 1946, with athletic competition beginning in the 1947–48 school year.

Charter members
For its first 24 years, the conference consisted of the six charter members, each of which was the flagship public university of its state:
 University of Connecticut
 University of Maine
 University of Massachusetts Amherst (new name adopted in 1947)
 University of New Hampshire
 University of Rhode Island (known as Rhode Island State College until 1951)
 University of Vermont
During this time, Yankee Conference football teams competed in the College Division of the NCAA, the lower of two tiers of varsity competition. The conference also sponsored several other sports, such as basketball and baseball. Conference bylaws required all members to field teams in all conference-sponsored sports.

1970s: In and out in New England
In 1971, the conference announced its first expansion, the addition of Boston University and the College of the Holy Cross. Both are private institutions (nonsectarian and Roman Catholic, respectively), and fit within the conference's existing geographic footprint, giving it a presence in Massachusetts' largest (Boston) and second-largest (Worcester) cities. 

Both had previously competed as independents, and had a long tradition of meeting Yankee Conference members in non-league games. Because their seasons were scheduled years in advance, neither BU nor HC were able to begin league play in football immediately. Though it officially joined the conference in 1971, Boston University did not start competing for the football championship until 1973; Holy Cross never did.

Holy Cross had made another decision in the early 1970s that profoundly affected its athletics teams: the formerly all-male college began admitting women. Holy Cross already had by far the smallest enrollment in the conference, and administrators reached the conclusion that its shrinking male population would not be able to field competitive teams in all Yankee Conference sports. Accordingly, Holy Cross announced in November 1972 that it would quit the conference immediately.  

The conference rule that all members must compete in all sports was tested again in 1974, when Vermont announced it would drop its football program at the end of that season. In 1975, the conference allowed its members to choose conference participation on a sport-by-sport basis. Later in the year, however, it opted to drop sponsorship of all sports except football at the conclusion of the 1975–76 season, effectively ending Vermont's association with the conference. 

The 1970s also brought a change in how the NCAA classified football programs. In 1973, the old College Division was replaced by NCAA Division II, for "minor" programs that offer athletic scholarships, and NCAA Division III, for those without scholarships. The Yankee Conference programs were all placed in Division II. In 1978, the NCAA introduced Division I-AA, a subdivision that allowed universities competing in Division I in other sports to field football teams in that division without having to match up with the major football powers. From that point, all Yankee Conference members have been members of Division I-AA, later renamed the Football Championship Subdivision.

1980s–90s: Expansion in the South
Through the late 1970s and early 1980s, the football-only Yankee Conference included six members: Boston University, UConn, Maine, UMass, UNH and URI. Starting in the mid-1980s, the conference began to admit members from outside New England, forming a second cluster of universities in the Mid-Atlantic region:
 University of Delaware in 1986 (in Delaware)
 University of Richmond in 1986 (in Virginia)
 Villanova University in 1988 (in Pennsylvania)
 James Madison University in 1993 (in Virginia)
 College of William & Mary in 1993 (in Virginia)
Also in 1993, Northeastern University in Boston joined the Yankee Conference.

Following the 1993 additions, the Yankee Conference had 12 members, and split into two six-team divisions, a "New England Division" consisting of the five remaining charter members plus Boston University, and a "Mid-Atlantic Division" consisting of the colleges that joined the conference in the 1980s and 1990s. Northeastern competed in the Mid-Atlantic despite being geographically located in New England.

1996: Merger with A-10
The 12-member, two-division arrangement continued until 1996, when the NCAA adopted rules limiting the influence of single-sport conferences over policy. Facing extinction, the conference merged with the Atlantic 10 Conference (A-10), which did not previously sponsor football, on November 13, 1996. UMass and URI were already members of the A-10 in other sports; the other 10 Yankee members became associate members in football only. For the 1997 season, the A-10 football league had the exact same members and division structure as the 1996 Yankee Conference.

After membership changes in the Colonial Athletic Association over the following 10 years, management of the A-10 football conference, which continued to include most of the former Yankee Conference teams, passed to the CAA in 2007.

Member institutions

† Boston University joined the conference in 1971, but did not compete for the football championship until 1973.
‡ Holy Cross and Vermont ended their Yankee Conference affiliation in 1972 and 1976, respectively. Holy Cross never competed in the football championship, and Vermont ended its football program after 1974. All other conference members remained until 1996, when the league was absorbed by the Atlantic 10.

Membership timeline

Overtime rule 
The Yankee Conference was the first college football conference to implement college football's current overtime rules.  The overtime rules known as the "Kansas Playoff" or "Kansas Plan", where each team is given a possession at the 25 yard line, was used by the Yankee Conference to determine the end to tie games well before it was adopted by the rest of the NCAA in 1996.

Conference champions

Football

Men's basketball

Men's soccer 
 1965: Vermont, Massachusetts, Connecticut
 1966: Vermont
 1967: Vermont
 1968: Vermont, Rhode Island
 1969: Vermont
 1970: Massachusetts
 1971: Rhode Island, Vermont
 1972: Rhode Island
 1973: Connecticut
 1974: Connecticut
 1975: Vermont
 1976: Connecticut
 1977: Rhode Island
 1978: Connecticut
 1979: New Hampshire

Modern club football conference
The phrase "Yankee Conference" is alluded to in the 21st-century Yankee Collegiate Football Conference, which fields teams at the club football level. 

Three of the schools in the original Yankee Conference, Boston University, Maine and Vermont, fielded teams in the modern Yankee Conference: since neither Boston nor Vermont currently has a varsity team, the club football team was the highest ranking football team representing the school in both cases. 

The other two schools in the modern Yankee Conference were Clarkson University and Onondaga Community College. The conference also allowed an independent team, the Southwestern Connecticut Grizzlies, to play in the league and contest for the championship, even though it was not associated with any college or university. The modern conference last played in 2016.

See also
List of defunct college football conferences

References

 
Sports leagues established in 1946
Sports leagues disestablished in 1997
1946 establishments in the United States
1997 disestablishments in the United States
Defunct NCAA Division I conferences
Defunct NCAA Division II conferences